Admiral Sir Marshal Llewelyn Clarke, KBE, CB, DSC (9 May 1887 – 8 April 1959) was a Royal Navy officer.

The second child and elder son of the artillery officer and colonial administrator Sir Marshal James Clarke, Marshal Llewelyn Clarke was born in Basutoland, where his father was serving as its first Resident Commissioner.

He was Admiral-superintendent, Portsmouth, from 1940 to 1945.

References 

 https://www.ukwhoswho.com/view/10.1093/ww/9780199540891.001.0001/ww-9780199540884-e-235784
 http://www.dreadnoughtproject.org/tfs/index.php/Marshal_Llewelyn_Clarke
 "Adm. Sir Marshall Clarke", The Times, 11 April 1959, p. 10.

1887 births
1959 deaths
Royal Navy admirals of World War II
Knights Commander of the Order of the British Empire
Companions of the Order of the Bath
Recipients of the Distinguished Service Cross (United Kingdom)
Royal Navy admirals
British people in Basutoland